Zhao Yong is the atonal pinyin romanization of the Mandarin pronunciation of various Chinese names.

It may refer to:

 Zhao Yong (king) (趙雍; d. 295BC), a king of Zhao, posthumously known as its Wuling King
 Zhao Yong (painter) (趙雍; 1289– ), a painter during the Yuan dynasty
 Zhao Yong (general) (赵庸), general executed by Zhu Yuanzhang during the Ming dynasty 
 Zhao Yong (politician) (赵勇; b.1963), a politician in Hebei, China